William Edward West (1788  February 8, 1859) was an American painter, primarily of portraits.

Family
West was born in Lexington, Kentucky in 1788. His father was a silversmith, and responsible for his early artistic training. In 1809 he moved to Philadelphia where he studied with Thomas Sully.

Career
In 1817 West traveled extensively around Europe, in particular Italy (where he studied in Florence under the painter Giuseppe Bezzuoli), France, and England. He frequently painted commissioned portraits by wealthy families. During this time he met Washington Irving who West collaborated with to provide numerous illustrations for Irving's books. West's works were shown at the Royal Academy of Arts and the British Institution. He returned to the United States, and settled in Baltimore where he continued to paint portraits until his death in 1859.

External Link

References

1788 births
1859 deaths
19th-century American painters
People from Lexington, Kentucky